Jiří Orság (born 5 January 1989 in Znojmo) is a Czech weightlifter.

Career 

In 2014 Orság was sanctioned for the use of Tamoxifen. After the sanction he stopped training for 6 months; during this time he began a different healthy lifestyle, losing 12 kg and earning a certificate in bodybuilding and becoming a fitness instructor. He struggled upon returning to training, telling an interviewer it was like as if he hadn't touched it in 10 years. For the first few weeks he was working on technique and the movements, but muscle memory helped speed up the process and after two months he was able to snatch 150 kg. Training by himself in 2015, he reached a 185 kg snatch, 5 kg below his best, and a 220 kg Clean and Jerk (20 kg below his best). During this period of training, Orság was motivated by the goal of competing at the 2015 WWC and the 2016 EWC, competitions required to qualify for the 2016 Summer Olympics in Rio de Janeiro.

Accomplishments in sport

Personal Records 
Snatch: 190 kg in competition / 195 kg in training

Clean & Jerk: 245 kg in competition / 243 kg in training

Front Squat: 290 kg

Back Squat: 340 kg

Deadlift: Snatch Grip 250 kg, Clean Grip 300 kg

Push Press: 181 kg x2

References

External links
 

1989 births
Living people
People from Znojmo
Czech male weightlifters
Olympic weightlifters of the Czech Republic
Weightlifters at the 2012 Summer Olympics
Weightlifters at the 2016 Summer Olympics
European Weightlifting Championships medalists
Weightlifters at the 2020 Summer Olympics
Sportspeople from the South Moravian Region
21st-century Czech people